Violent Restitution is the fifth full-length album from the Canadian speed/thrash metal band Razor released in 1988. It is the first album to feature Rob Mills on drums and Dave Carlo's brother Adam on bass and the last one to feature Stace "Sheepdog" McLaren on vocals. The album is dedicated to late actor Charles Bronson.

Track listing

Notes
 Re-issued in 2011 as a 12" limited edition colored vinyl by High Roller Records, limited to 650 copies. It includes a poster and a cardboard lyric sheet
 Re-issued in 2015 as a 12" limited edition vinyl with black and clear pink splatter variants. Lyrics are insert with full-sized poster
 Re-issued in 2016 as a 12" remastered limited edition colored vinyl by High Roller Records, limited to 350 copies. Issued in 425gsm heavy cardboard cover with printed lyric sheet and a poster. Extra insert with HHR releases included
 Re-issued in 2019 as a 12" remastered limited edition colored vinyl by High Roller Records, limited to 500 copies. Contents same as above

Personnel
Stace McLaren - Vocals
Dave Carlo - Guitars
Adam Carlo - Bass
Rob Mills - Drums

Production
Brian Taylor - Producer
Stephen Darch - Photography
Steve Hutchens - Cover art
André Tueroff - Back cover
Bill Kennedy - Engineering

Razor (band) albums
1990 albums
SPV/Steamhammer albums